Tomsk State University of Control Systems and Radioelectronics (abbreviated as TUSUR) is a public university in Tomsk, Russia. Founded in 1962, TUSUR University was formed when two faculties, the Faculty of Radio Engineering and the Faculty of Electric Radio Control, split from Tomsk Polytechnic University to create a new educational institution. The mission of TUSUR as an entrepreneurial research university is “to create cultural, educational, research and innovative environment, ensuring achievement of success by alumni whose labor and knowledge guarantee that high technologies serve the country, society and the world”.

TUSUR is recognized nationally as one of the leading engineering universities in Russia. It carries out extensive basic and applied research in the area of its expertise and maintains close links to the industry, making it one of the highest-performing research universities in the country.

History
TUSUR was founded as Tomsk Institute of Radioelectronics and Electronic Engineering by decree of the Council of Ministers of the Soviet Union on April 21, 1962. Its goal was to train engineers and researchers for the radioelectronic, missile and space industries. The university was formed by splitting off two faculties of Tomsk Polytechnic University, the Faculty of Radio Engineering and the Faculty of Electric Radio Control, along with 2000 of their undergraduate and postgraduate students and 60 faculty members. The original structure of the newly founded institute included 21 departments, 9 of which were transferred from TPU, and three faculties for full-time students (Faculties of Radio Engineering, Radio Equipment and Electronic Engineering) and one faculty of extramural learning. Initially, the university was offering 6 highly specialized degree programs, but in subsequent decades it has been differentiating its academic profile, adding engineering majors in automated control systems, physical electronics, automation of data processing, computer engineering. In 1971 the university was renamed as Tomsk Institute of Automated Control Systems and Radioelectronics.

In 1997 TUSUR obtained the status of a university, adopting its modern name. As part of the process of its continuing academic and scientific diversification, starting in the late 1990 the university opened faculties of human sciences, law, economics and innovation.

Academics
TUSUR University offers over 70 degree programs through its 13 faculties:

 Faculty of Radio Engineering
 Faculty of Radio Design
 Faculty of Computer Systems
 Faculty of Control Systems
 Faculty of Electronic Engineering
 Faculty of Economics
 Faculty of Innovation Technologies
 Faculty of Human Sciences
 Faculty of Law
 Faculty of Security
 Faculty of Distance Learning
 Faculty of Extramural and Evening Education
 Faculty of Advanced Training

TUSUR University has an extensive distance learning network, over half of its student population pursuing degree programs through its Faculty of Distance Learning using web-based technologies.

Project-based learning is an actively employed teaching method in the university, used to expand and supplement the traditional lecture-based educational process, and is often cited as the key factor determining the high level of employability of TUSUR graduates.

International affairs 
TUSUR University ranks third among Russian universities by percentage of international students enrolled in its degree programs.

The university employs the European Credit Transfer System (ECTS), which encourages free movement of students and simplifies international recognition of student achievements and degrees obtained at TUSUR. 

The university is a member of the CDIO Initiative - one of the few Russian universities to have joined the educational framework.

TUSUR runs joint academic programs with numerous partner universities and institutions such as Ritsumeikan University in Japan, State University of New York in the US, EPITECH and the University of Limoges in France, ITRI in Tawian, International Business Academy in Kazakhstan.

In its research activities, the university maintains strong international ties with companies, universities and institutes based in the US, Germany, the Netherlands, France, China.

Research
Priority lines of research at TUSUR:
 Nanoelectronics – microwave nanoelectronics, optoelectronics and nanophotonics, plasma emission electronics, electronic components
 Radio and telecommunications systems – radiolocation, television, radio communication and radiometry systems, pulse and radio-frequency measurements, intelligent control systems, information security
 Intelligent power electronics – space technology control and ground testing systems, energy-saving power transmission, distribution and management systems
 Innovations – process management in development of new high-tech products
 Robotics

Research at TUSUR University is supported by its research institutes:
 Research Institute of Automatics and Electromechanics
 Research Institute of Radio Engineering Systems
 Research Institute of Electrical Communications
 Research Institute of Electronic Technology Equipment and Communications
 Research Institute of Industrial Electronics
 Research Institute of LED Technologies
 Research Institute of Space Technology
The university publishes its research results in its quarterly journal Proceedings of TUSUR University. The journal is listed among the leading Russian scientific journals and magazines recommended by the Higher Attestation Commission of Russia for publication of the key research findings of Candidate and Doctoral (PhD) theses in:
 electronics, measurement equipment, radio engineering and communications
 control systems, computers and computer science
 power generation

UNIQ
TUSUR University maintains close links to its alumni and spin-out companies, which form an integral part of the UNIQ. 

The UNIQ is a cluster of organizations associated with TUSUR and incorporated into its business-support infrastructure. The UNIQ includes some 150 high-tech companies founded by the TUSUR alumni, 5 research institutes, 48 research laboratories, 26 student design bureaus, engineering center, technology park, student business incubator. The UNIC enterprises are responsible for 80% of the total high-tech product output in Tomsk region.

In 2013 an MIT/Skoltech research named TUSUR University one of the top nine international universities “having created/supported highly effective technology innovation ecosystems despite a challenging environment”.

Sports
TUSUR University has active sports clubs for students, faculty and alumni. The mountaineering and tourism club of TUSUR was founded in 1962. The Rowing Club of TUSUR University was founded in 1964. In 1979 the university built its own rowing tank.

Culture 
TUSUR University is the founder and organizer of the RadioBOOM festival – a series of scientific, cultural and sports events held in May in celebration of the Radio Day, which is treated as the main professional holiday for its students.

The University cultivates volunteering among its students, along with the student brigade movement which was a method employed by Soviet universities to engage their students in construction or agricultural projects and offer them an opportunity to make money during their vacations.

External links
 University Home Page in English
 Institute for Innovations
 UNIC Cluster
 Department of Microwave and Quantum Radio Engineering
 Center of Security Technology Official Page

References

Universities and institutes established in the Soviet Union
Universities in Tomsk Oblast
Educational institutions established in 1962
Engineering universities and colleges in Russia
Buildings and structures in Tomsk
1962 establishments in Russia